The skilletfish, (Gobiesox strumosus), is a member of the family Gobiesocidae, composed of clingfishes. These are mainly marine, tropical and temperate fishes characterized by a powerful sucking disk on the underside of the forebody.

Description 
The skilletfish has a frying pan-shaped body which can grow to about 3 inches in length. The body is compressed dorsoventrally with the head being wider than the body. Tiny eyes are located on top of the head. The fish also has strong teeth and fleshy lips. Color varies from a pale gray to dark brown with a mottled pattern. About 6 faint lines radiate from eye. The fish also has a dark band at the base of its rounded tail fin. Modified pelvic fins form a large suction disc on the underside of the body. The dorsal and ventral fins are set fairly far back on the body.

Diet 
Skilletfish primarily feed on bristle worms and small crustaceans such as amphipods and isopods.

Habitat 
Usually lives among oyster reefs, but may also be found within eelgrass beds. Stays in shallow waters near the shore during warmer months but will move to deeper waters in winter. Almost always clings to rocks or shells with suction disc.

Reproduction and life cycle 
For the skilletfish, spawning occurs between April to August. The female will lay a few hundred sticky, amber-colored eggs into an empty oyster shell, which the male will then protect until they hatch. Upon hatching, the fish is 2.4-3.4 mm long, and it generally grows about 9 mm during development, eventually reaching 40–45 mm long when it is time for the first reproduction

Distribution 
The skilletfish can be found in the Western Atlantic: Bermuda, New Jersey and northern Gulf of Mexico in USA to southeastern Brazil. It is absent from the Bahamas. It can also be found in the Eastern Central Pacific: coastal lagoons and tidal flats of Sonora, Sinaloa and Nayarit, Mexico. The skillet ranges from New Jersey and New York in the northern end of its distribution south to Brazil, also occurring in the West Indies and the Gulf of Mexico.

Etymology 
In Latin, Gobiesox means gobius which can equate to gudgeon. Strumosus contains the Latin word struma which refers to a swelling or tumor.

References 

1.	The River Project Unpublished Data

strumosus
Fish described in 1870